Hammersmith was a civil parish and metropolitan borough in London, England. It was formed as a civil parish in 1834 from the chapelry of Hammersmith that had existed in the ancient parish of Fulham, Middlesex since 1631. The parish was grouped with Fulham as the Fulham District from 1855 until 1886, when separate parish administration was restored. In 1889 it became part of the County of London and in 1900 it became a metropolitan borough. It included Hammersmith, Wormwood Scrubs, Old Oak Common and Shepherd's Bush. In 1965 it was abolished and became the northern part of the London Borough of Hammersmith, since 1979 renamed the London Borough of Hammersmith and Fulham.

History
Hammersmith was part of the ancient parish of Fulham, Middlesex which occupied broadly the same area as the current London Borough of Hammersmith and Fulham in Greater London.

A chapel of ease was built for Hammersmith in 1631 and the chapelry developed its own independent vestry. This was recognised in 1834 when the parish of Hammersmith was split from the parish of Fulham. In 1855 the two parishes were combined for civil purposes as the Fulham District, governed by the Fulham District Board of Works. This coincided with the parish becoming part of the area of responsibility of the Metropolitan Board of Works.

In 1886 the district was dissolved and the parish was governed by the Hammersmith Vestry. It was transferred from the County of Middlesex to the County of London in 1889. The parish became a metropolitan borough in 1900 and the Hammersmith Vestry became Hammersmith Borough Council.

In 1965 it was merged with the Metropolitan Borough of Fulham to form the London Borough of Hammersmith and was renamed Hammersmith and Fulham in 1979. The new London borough council retained Hammersmith's motto of Spectemur Agendo, although it was spelled out in English ("Let us be judged by our acts") in the new coat of arms for the first few years.

Coat of arms

The coat of arms of the Metropolitan Borough of Hammersmith was granted in 1897. It was Per pale azure and gules on a chevron or between in chief two cross crosslets and in base a scallop argent, three horseshoes of the second. The cross crosslets come from the arms of Edward Latymer, who founded schools in Hammersmith in the seventeenth century which later evolved into Latymer Upper School and the Godolphin and Latymer School (both feature cross crosslets in their coats of arms). The horseshoes come from the arms of brickmaker Nicholas Crisp, who introduced his technique into Hammersmith and who helped build a chapel, which was to become Hammersmith's parish church of Saint Paul; and the scallop comes from the arms of George Pring, a surgeon who projected  Hammersmith Bridge. The crest was a castle tower surmounted by two hammers, a pun on the name Hammersmith.

Poor law
With the introduction of the New Poor Law the parish became part of the Kensington Poor Law Union in 1837. From 1845, it was grouped with Fulham as the Fulham Poor Law Union. In 1889 Hammersmith became a single parish for poor law purposes and this lasted until the boards of guardians were abolished in 1930.

Population and area
The borough covered . It included Hammersmith, Wormwood Scrubs, Old Oak Common and Shepherd's Bush.

The population in each census was:

Hammersmith Vestry 1801–1899

Metropolitan Borough 1900–1961

Politics

Under the Metropolis Management Act 1855 any parish that exceeded 2,000 ratepayers was to be divided into wards; however the parishes of Fulham District Board of Works did not exceed this number so were not divided into wards.

In 1873 the population had increased enough for the parish of Hammersmith to be divided into three wards (electing vestrymen): North (24), Centre (27) and South (21).

In 1894 as its population had increased the newly incorporated vestry was re-divided into six wards (electing vestrymen): No. 1 (12), No. 2 (18), No. 3 (15), No. 4 (15), No. 5 (6) and No. 6 (6).

The metropolitan borough was divided into seven wards for elections: No. 1, No. 2, No. 3, No. 4, No. 5, No. 6 and No. 7.

Borough council

Parliament constituency
For elections to Parliament, the borough was represented by one constituency:
Hammersmith
In 1918 the borough's representation was increased to two seats:
Hammersmith North
Hammersmith South
In 1955 the borough's representation was reduced to one and a half seats, when part of it was merged with Fulham:
Barons Court
Hammersmith North

References

Further reading
 

Metropolitan boroughs of the County of London
History of the London Borough of Hammersmith and Fulham
1834 establishments in the United Kingdom 
1900 establishments in the United Kingdom 
1965 disestablishments in the United Kingdom
Districts abolished by the London Government Act 1963
Metropolitan Borough of